Beirut is an American band that was originally the solo musical project of Zach Condon. Beirut's music combines elements of indie rock and world music. The band's first performance with the full brass section was in New York, in May 2006, in support of their debut album Gulag Orkestar, but performed their first show with Condon, Petree, and Collins at the College of Santa Fe earlier that year.

Condon named the band after Lebanon's capital, because of the city's history of conflict and as a place where cultures collide. Beirut performed in Lebanon for the first time in 2014, at the Byblos International Festival.

History

Early years 
Zach Condon was born in Albuquerque, New Mexico on February 13, 1986. He grew up in Newport News, Virginia and Santa Fe, New Mexico. Condon played trumpet in a jazz band as a teenager and cites jazz as a major influence.

Condon attended Santa Fe High School, until dropping out when he was 17. Work at a cinema showing international films piqued his interest in Fellini arias, Sicilian funeral brass, and Balkan music.

Condon attended community college for a short period, then traveled to Europe at the age of 17 with his older brother, Ryan. Condon's exploration of world music developed Beirut's melodic sound. Zach's younger brother Ross Condon played in the band Total Slacker.

Gulag Orkestar 
Returning from Europe, Condon enrolled at the University of New Mexico, where he studied Portuguese and photography. Condon recorded most of the material for Gulag Orkestar alone in his bedroom, finishing the album in a studio with Jeremy Barnes (Neutral Milk Hotel, A Hawk and a Hacksaw) and Heather Trost (A Hawk and a Hacksaw), who became early contributors to the band.

Ba Da Bing Records signed Condon on the strength of the recordings. Condon recruited friends to play Gulag Orkestar'''s first live shows in New York in May 2006.

Beirut's first music video was for Elephant Gun, directed by Alma Har'el who also directed the band's second video "Postcards from Italy". Lon Gisland was the full band's first release in 2007.

 The Flying Club Cup 
Beirut's second album, The Flying Club Cup, was recorded largely at a makeshift studio in Albuquerque and completed at Arcade Fire's studio in Quebec. The music on the album has a French influence due to Condon's interest in French chanson during its recording. Condon has cited Francophone singers Jacques Brel, Serge Gainsbourg and Yves Montand as influences. He also expressed interest in French film and culture, claiming this was his original reason for traveling to Europe. The Flying Club Cup was officially released in October 2007. In September 2007 they did a Take-Away Show acoustic video session shot by Vincent Moon. The DVD Cheap Magic Inside was shot but quickly sold out; in December 2010, Beirut, Ba Da Bing, and La Blogothèque authorized its dissemination via digital download.

 March of the Zapotec 

On April 3, 2008, Beirut canceled a previously announced summer European tour. Already in 2006, Beirut canceled the European leg of the tour due in the fall because after two months of the US tour, Condon stated that after two months of touring, he was suffering from exhaustion. Zach Condon explained the cancellations in a post on the official Beirut website, stating that he wanted to put the effort into ensuring that any shows would be "as good as humanly possible". In January 2009 the double EP March of the Zapotec/Holland EP was released, containing an official Beirut release based on Condon's recent trip to Oaxaca (March of the Zapotec), and electronic music under the "Realpeople" name (Holland).
On February 6, 2009 Beirut made their debut television performance in the United States on the Late Show with David Letterman, performing "A Sunday Smile".

The Rip Tide
In early June 2011, amidst touring the US, Beirut announced that their newest album, The Rip Tide, which had been recorded the previous winter in upstate New York, was to be released on August 30. The band simultaneously released the single  "East Harlem" (first recorded on Live at the Music Hall of Williamsburg), with the B-side "Goshen". The album was recorded, managed, and released under Condon's own Pompeii Records.
Reviewers and fellow musicians have noted that, unlike the prior albums which drew heavily on foreign music from Mexico, France, the Balkans, etc., this one has shown Beirut with its own, more pop-oriented sound; saying, "what emerges [on The Rip Tide] is a style that belongs uniquely and distinctly to Beirut, one that has actually been there all along." One reviewer noted that "the Euro influences [of Beirut's previous albums] are still there, but the presiding spirit is old-fashioned American pop." This album also differs from Beirut's previous albums in that the music was recorded as a band playing together rather than laying down individual tracks one at a time, though the lyrics were only added by Condon after all the music had been recorded.

No No No
On June 1, 2015, Beirut announced their fourth album, No No No, released on September 11, 2015. On the same day, the title track "No No No" was released for streaming. The album was recorded following a period of turmoil in Condon's life, facing a divorce and having been admitted into a hospital in Australia for exhaustion following extensive touring. However, Condon recovered fully thanks to a new relationship and his return to New York. Beirut also announced a tour for the album.

Gallipoli
On October 22, 2018, Condon announced Beirut's next album, Gallipoli, released on February 1, 2019. The album is named after the Italian town where Condon wrote the title track. On January 10, 2019, the music video for Beirut's new song "Landslide" was released. 
On February 9, 2019, Beirut appeared on the "Saturday Sessions" segment of CBS This Morning's Saturday program, playing selections from "Gallipoli."

The inspiration for Gallipoli started with an old Farfisa organ that Condon had shipped to New York from his parents' home in New Mexico. He acquired the organ in High School when a traveling circus left it in the warehouse of his old workplace. The organ had broken keys and functions, but he managed to write most of his first (Gulag Orkestar) and large parts of his second (The Flying Club Cup) records on it.  Condon started writing the first songs of Gallipoli on this organ sometime in late 2016 at his home in Brooklyn. As songwriting progressed to the studio, Gabe Wax (the producer of No No No) was brought in to help usher in the particular sonic qualities of Gallipoli, which consisted of pushing every instrument and sound to its "near breaking point" (much as he did years ago with the old, broken Farisa organ), by channeling instruments through broken amplifiers, tape machines and PA systems. Recording commenced in Fall of 2017, after travels through Europe, at Sudestudio in Guagnano, Italy, with the help of studio owner Stefano Manca. Gallipoli was completed with final vocals, mixing and mastering happening at both Condon's apartment and Vox Ton studios in Berlin, Germany.

Artifacts
On October 20, 2021, Beirut announced their next album, Artifacts, to be released January 28, 2022, via the release of the single "Fisher Island Sound" on the band's official YouTube channel. The album is a compilation of "collected EPs, singles, B-sides and early work," including a re-release of the Lon Gisland EP.

 Personnel 
Condon plays a rotary-valve trumpet and the ukulele as his main instruments. He bought the ukulele as a joke stage prop, but found he liked the sound and was able to play it despite a wrist injury that inhibited him from playing guitar. Condon also plays the piston trumpet, euphonium, mandolin, accordion, various keyboard instruments, and a modified conch shell that appears on The Flying Club Cup.

Live, Beirut's roster generally consists of:
Zach Condon – trumpet/flugelhorn/ukulele
Nick Petree – drums/percussion/melodica
Paul Collins – electric bass/upright bass
Kyle Resnick - trumpet
Ben Lanz – trombone/sousaphone/glockenspiel
Aaron Arntz - piano/keyboards
Past members include:
Kristin Ferebee – violin
Jason Poranski – guitar/mandolin/ukulele
Heather Trost – violin/viola
Jon Natchez – baritone sax/mandolin/glockenspiel/keyboards
Tracy Pratt – trumpet/euphonium/flugelhorn
Greg Paulus – trumpet
Kelly Pratt – trumpet/french horn/glockenspiel/keyboards
Jared van Fleet – piano
Perrin Cloutier – accordion/cello
Sharon Van Etten, who contributes vocals to two tracks on The Rip TideThe majority of the members of Beirut have performed live as well as appeared on recorded material.

 Side projects 

 Realpeople 
Realpeople is Zach Condon's electronic side-project. It was under this name that Condon made his first (unreleased) album, The Joys of Losing Weight, and the name to which the Holland EP is credited. The Joys of Losing Weight, which was made when Condon was fifteen, has never been released officially, but has been leaked on the internet.

 1971 
Condon has also released an EP, Small-Time American Bats, under the name "1971". The EP was recorded with his friend Alex Gaziano on guitar and vocals, when they were both around 16 years old (2002). Gaziano is a founding member of Kidcrash, another band from Santa Fe.

Soft Landing
Soft Landing was a project started by Beirut members Paul Collins (bass) and Perrin Cloutier (accordion) and Mike Lawless. Their eponymous debut album was released on October 12, 2010 on Ba Da Bing records, and has been described as "a pop version of Beirut" and freak-folk, with a heavy emphasis on dance beats and sheer energy.

 Pompeii Records 
Pompeii Records is the record label founded in 2009 by Zach Condon in order to give the band and himself full control over their music. The first recordings released on the label were the band's double EP,  March of the Zapotec/Holland EP.

Guest appearances 
Condon plays the mandolin, trumpet and ukulele on A Hawk and a Hacksaw's album A Hawk and a Hacksaw and the Hun Hangár Ensemble, and trumpet and ukulele on Alaska in Winter's album Dance Party in the Balkans. He appears on Get Him Eat Him's album Arms Down on the song "2×2".

Condon is featured on the song "Found Too Low RMX" by fellow Santa Fe-native Pictureplane and appears on the first and last tracks of the Grizzly Bear EP Friend.

Condon also appeared on The New Pornographers' fifth album Together.

Rock group Blondie's 2011 album Panic of Girls features a ska cover of "A Sunday Smile" on which Condon plays trumpet. He also plays on "Le Bleu".

On the benefit album Red Hot + Rio 2, Beirut performed a cover of the Portuguese-language song "O Leãozinho", originally written by Brazilian composer and singer Caetano Veloso.

Condon is featured singing on the track "We Are Fine" on indie rocker Sharon Van Etten's 2012 album Tramp.

Condon also contributed to four songs on Mouse on Mars' 2018 album Dimensional People.

Discography

Albums

EPs 
 The Guns of Brixton / Interior of a Dutch House (November 13, 2006) – Calexico/Beirut 7″ split single
 Lon Gisland (January 30, 2007)
 Pompeii EP (February 28, 2007)
 Elephant Gun EP (June 25, 2007)
 March of the Zapotec/Holland EP (February 16, 2009 – Unofficially released onto iTunes on January 27) US No. 87 UK No. 101 and FR No. 14

Compilations 
Dark Was the Night Beirut contributed the song Mimizan to the charity compilation benefiting the Red Hot Organization

Again in 2011, they contributed a cover of Caetano Veloso's song "O Leãozinho" to the Red Hot Organization's most recent charitable album Red Hot+Rio 2. The album is a follow-up to the 1996 Red Hot+Rio. Proceeds from the sales will be donated to raise awareness and money to fight AIDS/HIV and related health and social issues.

DVDs 
 Cheap Magic Inside (2007)
 Beirut: Live at the Music Hall of Williamsburg (2009)

References

External links 

 

Musical groups established in 2006
Indie rock musical groups from New Mexico
Musical groups from New Mexico
American world music groups
American folk rock groups
American electronic musicians
Baroque pop musicians